Nadav Shragai is an Israeli author and journalist.

Biography
Nadav Shragai is the grandson of Shlomo Zalman Shragai, who served as mayor of West Jerusalem in the early 1950s. Shragai was a correspondent for Israeli newspaper Haaretz in 1983-2009, covering national security and religious affairs. He  has published a number of books on the Israeli–Palestinian conflict.

Shragai's articles on Israeli security issues, international law and related topics have been published by the Jerusalem Center for Public Affairs. His book Temple of Dispute about the Temple Mount was published by Keter Publishing House in 1995

On his deathbed, former Israeli general Uzi Narkiss told Shragai that Shlomo Goren, former Chief Rabbi of Israel, urged him to blow up the Dome of the Rock, known by many in the past as the Mosque of Omar.

Shragai lives in Jerusalem. He is married with five children and one grandchild.

Views and opinions
Haaretz publisher Amos Schocken said that Shragai was  a journalist with clear opinions with which he largely disagreed,  but "his opinions never influenced his news reporting, which was always professional."

Published works
Understanding Israeli Interests in the E1 Area: Contiguity, Security, and Jerusalem
The Al-Aksa Is in Danger Libel: The History of a Lie

See also
Media of Israel

References

Israeli non-fiction writers
Israeli journalists
Living people
Year of birth missing (living people)